[[Image:Verboten Zeitung 1933.jpg|thumb|right|250px|Das Andere Deutschlands final issue, announcing its own prohibition (Verbot) by the police authorities on the basis of the Reichstag fire decree]]
The Reichstag Fire Decree is the common name of the Decree of the Reich President for the Protection of People and State''' issued by German President Paul von Hindenburg on the advice of Chancellor Adolf Hitler on 28 February 1933 in immediate response to the Reichstag fire. The decree nullified many of the key civil liberties of German citizens. With Nazis in powerful positions in the German government, the decree was used as the legal basis for the imprisonment of anyone considered to be opponents of the Nazis, and to suppress publications not considered "friendly" to the Nazi cause. The decree is considered by historians as one of the key steps in the establishment of a one-party Nazi state in Germany.

 Background 
Hitler had been appointed Chancellor of Germany only four weeks previously, on 30 January 1933, when he was invited by President von Hindenburg to lead a coalition government. Hitler's government had urged von Hindenburg to dissolve the Reichstag and to call elections for 5 March.

On the evening of 27 February 1933—six days before the parliamentary election—fire broke out in the Reichstag chambers. While the exact circumstances of the fire remain unclear to this day, what is clear is that Hitler and his supporters quickly capitalized on the fire as a means by which to catalyse their consolidation of power. Hitler almost immediately blamed the Communist Party of Germany (KPD) for causing the blaze, and believed the fire would result in more Germans supporting the Nazis. According to Rudolf Diels, Hitler was heard shouting through the fire "these sub-humans do not understand how the people stand at our side. In their mouse-holes, out of which they now want to come, of course they hear nothing of the cheering of the masses."

Seizing on the burning of the Reichstag building as the supposed opening salvo in a communist uprising, the Nazis were able to throw millions of Germans into a convulsion of fear at the threat of communist terror. The official account stated:

The burning of the Reichstag was intended to be the signal for a bloody uprising and civil war. Large-scale pillaging in Berlin was planned for as early as four o'clock in the morning on Tuesday. It has been determined that starting today throughout Germany acts of terrorism were to begin against prominent individuals, against private property, against the lives and safety of the peaceful population, and general civil war was to be unleashed…

Within hours of the fire, dozens of Communists had been thrown into jail. The next day, officials in the Prussian Ministry of the Interior, which was led by Hermann Göring, discussed ways to provide legal cover for the arrests.  Ludwig Grauert, the chief of the Prussian state police, proposed an emergency presidential decree under Article 48 of the Weimar Constitution, which gave the president the power to take any measure necessary to protect public safety without the consent of the Reichstag. It would have suspended most civil liberties under the pretence of preventing further Communist violence. There had already been discussions within the Cabinet about enacting such measures. Justice Minister Franz Gürtner, a member of the Nazis' coalition partner, the German National People's Party (DNVP), had actually brought a draft decree before the cabinet on the afternoon of 27 February.

When the proposed decree was brought before the Reich Cabinet, Interior Minister Wilhelm Frick, the only Nazi in the cabinet who had a portfolio, added a clause that would allow the cabinet to take over the state governments if they failed to maintain order. Notably, the cabinet would have been allowed to do this on its own authority. Frick was well aware that the Interior portfolio had been given to the Nazis because it was almost powerless; unlike his counterparts in the rest of Europe, he had no power over the police. He saw a chance to extend his power over the states and thus begin the process of Nazifying the country.

At an emergency cabinet meeting, Hitler declared that the fire now made it a matter of "ruthless confrontation of the KPD"—a confrontation that could not be "made dependent on judicial considerations." Though Vice Chancellor Franz von Papen objected to the clause giving the Reich cabinet the power to take over the state governments if necessary, the decree was approved. Shortly thereafter, President von Hindenburg signed the decree into law.

The decree consisted of six articles. Article 1 indefinitely suspended most of the civil liberties set forth in the Weimar Constitution, including habeas corpus, inviolability of residence, secrecy of the post and telephone, freedom of expression and of the press, the right to public assembly, and the right of free association, as well as the protection of property and the home. Articles 2 and 3 allowed the Reich government to assume powers normally reserved for the federal states. Articles 4 and 5 established draconian penalties for certain offenses, including the death penalty for arson to public buildings. Article 6 simply stated that the decree took effect on the day of its proclamation.

Text of the decree
The preamble and Article 1 of the Reichstag Fire Decree show the methods by which the civil rights enshrined in the Weimar Constitution were legally abolished by the Hitler Government:

 Effects 
The decree was not accompanied by any written guidelines from the Reich government; this omission gave wide latitude in interpreting the decree to Nazis like Göring, who as Prussian interior minister was the commander of the largest police force in Germany. The Länder (German states) not yet in the Nazis' grasp largely restricted themselves to banning the Communist press, Communist meetings and demonstrations, and detaining leading KPD officials. In Prussia, however, summary arrests of KPD leaders were common, thousands were imprisoned in the days following the fire, and the total number of arrests in Prussia on the basis of the Reichstag Fire Decree in the two weeks following 28 February is believed to be in the vicinity of 10,000. Göring had actually employed such tactics even before the decree, only to have them thrown out by the courts—a check that no longer had any effect with the decree in place.

Among the German communists arrested on the basis of the Reichstag Fire Decree was KPD chairman Ernst Thälmann; while KPD founding members Wilhelm Pieck and Walter Ulbricht—later to be leaders in postwar East Germany—were among those who escaped arrest and lived in exile.

Göring issued a directive to the Prussian police authorities on 3 March, stating that in addition to the constitutional rights stripped by the decree, "all other restraints on police action imposed by Reich and State law" were abolished "so far as this is necessary … to achieve the purpose of the decree." Göring went on to say that

In keeping with the purpose and aim of the decree the additional measures … will be directed against the Communists in the first instance, but then also against those who co-operate with the Communists and who support or encourage their criminal aims. … I would point out that any necessary measures against members or establishments of other than Communist, anarchist or Social Democratic parties can only be justified by the decree … if they serve to help the defense against such Communist activities in the widest sense.

Within two weeks of the Reichstag Fire Decree taking effect, Reich Commissars were sent out to take over the other states; the heavy-handed repression that was occurring in Prussia quickly spread to the rest of the Reich.

Despite the virulent rhetoric directed against the Communists, the Nazis did not formally ban the KPD right away. Not only did they fear a violent uprising, but they hoped the KPD's presence on the ballot would siphon off votes from the Social Democratic Party (SPD). However, while the KPD managed to win 81 seats, it was an open secret that the KPD deputies would never be allowed to take their seats; they were thrown in jail as quickly as the police could track them down. Increasingly, the courts treated KPD membership as an act of treason. Thus, for all intents and purposes, the KPD was banned as of 6 March, the day after the election.

Just over three weeks after the passage of the Reichstag Fire Decree, Hitler further tightened his grasp on Germany by the passage of the Enabling Act. This act gave Hitler's cabinet the power to decree laws without being passed by the Reichstag—effectively giving Hitler dictatorial powers. Leaving nothing to chance, the Nazis did not even count the arrested KPD deputies for the purposes of determining a quorum. They also used the provisions of the Reichstag Fire Decree to detain several SPD deputies. Many others fled into exile. All of this ensured that it would pass with over 85 percent of the deputies who were present and voting, far more than the two-thirds majority required in the constitution. As it turned out, the session took place in such an intimidating atmosphere that the Enabling Act would have garnered the required supermajority even if all KPD and SPD deputies had been present.

In his book, The Coming of the Third Reich, British historian Richard J. Evans argued that the Enabling Act was legally invalid, in part because of the Reich Commissars' role in Nazifying the states. Evans argued that the states were "not properly constituted or represented" in the Reichsrat, and therefore that chamber's vote to pass the Enabling Act was "irregular."

In theory, Article 48 gave the Reichstag the power to demand the cancellation of the measures taken to enforce the Reichstag Fire Decree.  However, any realistic chance of it being cancelled ended in July; by this time the other parties had either been banned outright or intimidated into dissolving themselves, and the Nazi Party had been declared the only legal party in Germany.

The Reichstag Fire Decree remained in force for the duration of the Nazi era, allowing Hitler to rule under what amounted to martial law. Along with the Enabling Act, it formed the legal basis for Hitler's dictatorship. Thousands of Hitler's decrees, such as those which turned Germany into a one-party state, were explicitly based on its authority, and hence on Article 48. This was a major reason Hitler never formally abolished the Weimar Constitution, though it no longer had any substantive value after the passage of the Enabling Act. 

The Nazis' use of the Reichstag Fire Decree to give their dictatorship the appearance of legality, combined with the broader misuse of Article 48, was fresh on the minds of framers of the postwar Basic Law for the Federal Republic of Germany. They opted to significantly curb the powers of the president, to the point that they have little de facto executive power.

 See also 

 Gleichschaltung Rule by decree

 References 

 Further reading 
 Reichstagsbrandverordnung - Original German source text at Wikisource''

External links
 

1933 in law
1933 in Germany
Emergency laws in Germany
Law in Nazi Germany
Reichstag building
Political and cultural purges
Repealed German legislation
Law in Weimar Republic
Decrees